Citizens Development Business Finance PLC also abbreviated as CDB PLC or CDBF PLC is a Sri Lankan listed public limited company which works as a licensed finance company accepting deposits from general public. It is one of the leading finance companies in Sri Lanka and it is also ranked within the top five largest licensed financial institutions among the 46 non banking institutions in the country. In September 2019, the company received the Best Social Media Initiative of the Year at the 2019 Asian Banking & Finance Awards which was held at the Shangri-La Hotel Singapore. The company was also awarded the Sri Lankan Best Employer Brand of the Year in 2019.

Cooperate history 
The Citizens Development Business Finance was incorporated as a public limited company on 7 September 1995 and it is listed at the Colombo Stock Exchange. The company is licensed by the Monetary Board of the Central Bank of Sri Lanka under the Finance Business Act no 42 of 2011. As of 2019, the company has about 71 branches across the country.

References 

Financial services companies of Sri Lanka
Financial services companies established in 1995
Companies listed on the Colombo Stock Exchange
Sri Lankan companies established in 1995